Rich and Famous is a recording made by jazz drummer Buddy Rich released in 1983.  Originally released by Amway in the US, it has since been re-issued under different titles by different labels (The Magic of Buddy Rich (HMC Records), Buddy Rich, The Man (Synergie OMP), ...).

Track listing
LP side A:
"Red Snapper" (Bobby Shew) – 4:34
"Time Will Tell" (Joe Roccisano) – 5:07
"Ballad Of The Matador" (Frank Strazzeri) – 5:23
"Dancing Men" (Pat LaBarbera) – 4:59
LP side B:
"Cotton Tail" (Duke Ellington) – 5:05
"My One and Only Love" (Guy Wood, Robert Mellin) – 5:34
"Manhattan: The City/Central Park" (Dave Panichi) – 4:47

Personnel 
Buddy Rich – leader, drums
The Buddy Rich Big Band:
Trumpets: Doug Clark, Dana Watson, Andy Gravish, Jeff Folkens
Trombones: Dave Panichi, Mike Davis, George Gesslein (bass trb.)
Alto Sax: Mark Lopeman, Olivier Peters
Tenor Sax: Steve Marcus, Andy Sterman
Bari Sax: Keith Bishop
Piano: Lee Musiker
Bass: Dave Carpenter

References 
Personnel from Clarence Hintze's Discography of Buddy Rich from the book "Mister, I Am The Band!"
Rich & Famous (TKO Magnum / Meteor – MTLP 004) 1996 
The Magic of Buddy Rich (HMC Records HM-83-1010)
Buddy Rich: The Man (Synergie OMP / One Media Publishing) 
Rich and Famous at discogs.com

1983 albums
Buddy Rich albums